Mazzè Castle ( is a castle located in Mazzè, Piedmont, Italy.

History 
The castle belonged to the Valperga family for seven centuries, until its extinction in 1840. It was renovated and modified several times across the centuries. In particular, it is important to mention the renovation works performed under the direction of architect Velati Bellini in the 19th century, which gave the castle its current appearance.

Gallery

References

External links

Mazzè Castle on Turismo Torino e Provincia———

Castles in Piedmont